Joseph David Courtney (born April 6, 1953) is an American lawyer and politician serving as the U.S. representative for  since 2007. His district encompasses most of the eastern third of the state, including Norwich and New London. A member of the Democratic Party, Courtney served as the Connecticut state representative for the 56th district from 1987 to 1995 and Vernon town attorney from 2003 until 2006.

Early life and education 
Courtney grew up in suburban Hartford. In 1975, he graduated from Tufts University. He earned a J.D. degree from the University of Connecticut School of Law in 1978.

Early career 
After graduating from law school, Courtney worked as a public defender for three years. He became a partner in the law firm Flaherty, Meisler and Courtney, and also served as Town Attorney in Vernon, Connecticut, where he lives.

From 1987 to 1994, Courtney served in the Connecticut House of Representatives, representing Connecticut's 56th district. He chaired the Public Health and Human Service Committee and oversaw the Blue Ribbon Commission on Universal Health Insurance. In 1994, Connecticut Magazine honored him for his bipartisan efforts in the state house.

In 1998, after four years out of office, Courtney made an unsuccessful bid for lieutenant governor. In 2002, he ran for Congress against incumbent Republican Rob Simmons. Courtney did not announce his candidacy or raise money until September 2001; by that time, Simmons had more than $500,000 in campaign funding. Simmons defeated Courtney in the November election, 54% to 46%.

U.S. House of Representatives

Elections

2006

Courtney challenged Simmons again in 2006, in a race that political strategists projected would be very close. Courtney was declared the winner on Election Day; initial tallies showed him ahead by 167 votes, out of more than 242,000 votes. Under Connecticut law the race qualified for an automatic re-canvass because the winning margin was less than 0.5%. When the recount concluded on November 14, Courtney had 91 votes more than Simmons. The Washington Post later said that the final margin was 83 votes. It was the tightest congressional race of 2006.

2008 

Courtney's 2008 Republican challenger was the former commanding officer of the Naval Submarine Base New London, Sean Sullivan. Courtney won the election by a two-to-one margin.

On May 21, 2008, Courtney announced his endorsement of then-U.S. Senator Barack Obama for president.

2010 

Courtney was reelected, defeating Republican Janet Peckinpaugh, Green Party nominee Scott Deshefy, and Libertarian write-in Dan Reale.

2014

Courtney defeated Republican Lori Hopkins-Cavanagh, a business owner and radio show host from New London, Connecticut.

2016
In 2016, Courtney defeated Republican Daria Novak, Green Party candidate Jonathan Pelto and Libertarian Dan Reale. Novak co-hosted a weekly cable television show, "American Political Zone", and a nationally syndicated radio show, "Vernuccio-Novak Report."

2018
In April 2018, Dan Postemski, an Iraq War veteran and chair of the Hampton Republican Town Committee, announced his plans to challenge Courtney in the 2018 election. Postemski said that he wanted "to bring common sense to budgeting" and that he was "a strong supporter of the 2nd amendment" and would "fight to the death to save it." In a reference to Courtney's participation in a gun-control sit-in, Postemski said, "Joe Courtney has literally sat down on the job, right on the floor of the House. That’s not how a leader makes change." Courtney was reelected by more than 20 points.

Tenure

In August 2009, Courtney was criticized for holding a teleconference with voters about health care instead of an in-person town hall. Richard Hanley, graduate journalism director at Quinnipiac University, complained that part of Courtney's job "is to wade into the muck of the process as it is, not as we would like it to be."

Courtney has branded himself as bipartisan and has blamed various government crises on failure to "support a real compromise." In 2012, he said that though recent budget cuts to education were a "little heavy" and the Budget Control Act "ham-handed," he voted for them in a spirit of compromise. "It took guys like me to cross the aisle and make sure we didn't fall off the tracks there as a country," Courtney said.

After seeing Steven Spielberg's film Lincoln in February 2013, Courtney wrote Spielberg a letter pointing out that although the film showed Connecticut House members voting against the 13th Amendment, which abolished slavery, in fact the state's entire congressional delegation had supported the amendment. He asked Spielberg for some kind of acknowledgment of the error, perhaps on the DVD. "It's important that people be aware who saw this movie that we were a state that lost soldiers, were staunch supporters of Lincoln in both elections and, in the case of the Democrat from New Haven, actually voted against his party in support of the amendment," said Courtney, who made his letter public. "The state's good name, I personally feel, was tarnished a bit." His criticism, in the words of the Washington Post, "played well back home in Connecticut", where it occasioned "a number of grateful newspaper editorials", but "set off alarms in showbiz circles: Ballots had just gone out to Oscar voters. Was the congressman trying to influence the Academy Awards in favor of another contender?" The Post noted that "Courtney had a debt to Ben Affleck", who had campaigned for him and whose film Argo was up against Lincoln for Best Picture.

In March 2015, after receiving two phone calls at home from scammers impersonating IRS agents demanding payment of owed taxes, Courtney warned his constituents to be wary of such scams.

A golf game Courtney played with President Obama was highlighted on NPR in June 2015.

In response to purported Republican hostility toward Muslims, Democratic National Committee Vice Chair Debbie Wasserman Schultz urged Democratic members of Congress to invite Muslims as their guests to Obama's State of the Union address in January 2016. Accordingly, Courtney invited Mohammed Qureshi, president of the Baitul Aman Mosque, an Ahmadiyya house of worship in Connecticut. The invitation garnered considerable media attention.

Political positions

Taxes
In a statement responding to the Tax Cuts and Jobs Act of 2017, Courtney called it "one gigantic gift for corporations and the wealthiest Americans in exchange for next to nothing for average middle-class and working families."

Gun control
Along with other members of Congress who demanded that the House pass stricter gun-control legislation, Courtney took part in a sit-in on the House floor on June 22, 2016.

Health care
In 2010, Courtney was the leading voice in the House against the so-called "Cadillac tax" on high-dollar health plans, part of the funding proposed for the Patient Protection and Affordable Care Act.

Iraq War
In March 2008, Courtney called U.S. policy in Iraq "two-headed." While the Bush administration asked troops "to serve and sacrifice on behalf of Iraq's fledgling government," Iraqi leaders were friendly with Iran. "The White House," he wrote, "needs to work with Congress to construct a reasonable long term security agreement with Iraq that address Iraq's relations with Iran."

Iran nuclear deal
On August 6, 2015, Courtney issued a statement in support of Obama's Iran deal, officially known as the Joint Comprehensive Plan of Action. "I believe that the Joint Comprehensive Plan of Action is the best option for our nation and the international community to prevent Iran from gaining a nuclear weapons capability," he wrote.

When President Trump decided to withhold certification of the Iran nuclear agreement, Courtney issued a statement in which he claimed that Trump's move "directly contradicts the opinion of our nation's highest military leadership" and "puts us at odds with our closest allies such as the U.K., France and Germany, and undermines our country's ability to credibly execute a multilateral diplomatic resolution of the crisis in the Korean peninsula."

Military
Courtney is known for his success at delivering funding for his district's submarine bases, and has acquired the nickname "Two-Sub Joe" for having made possible the construction of two new submarines. In 2016, the Hartford Courant endorsed him primarily because he had "brought home defense jobs."

Trump travel ban
In March 2017, Courtney protested Trump's revised executive order temporarily restricting travel from six Muslim-majority countries. He maintained that America's "moderate allies from Muslim-majority nations" had "repeatedly warned President Trump that these rash orders damage our standing to lead the anti-ISIS coalition" and that the executive order would result in a "backlash...overseas." Courtney added that the U.S. is "a nation of opportunity and a nation of immigrants, and this blanket ban on entry from six nations could mean that best and the brightest from those countries, and other Muslim-majority countries will no longer view the United States as an option for making a better life. This ban is not only a prize propaganda tool for terrorists who want to hurt us, it hurts American prestige abroad, and harms American businesses, schools, and institutions that rely on the hard work of immigrants from around the world, including these six countries."

Syria
In 2023, Courtney voted against H.Con.Res. 21 which directed President Joe Biden to remove U.S. troops from Syria within 180 days.

Committee assignments
Committee on Armed Services
Subcommittee on Seapower and Projection Forces (Chair)
 Committee on Education and the Workforce
 Health, Employment, Labor, and Pensions subcommittee
 Higher Education and Workforce Training subcommittee

Before the 112th Congress, Courtney served on the Committee on Education and Labor with membership on the Subcommittee on Higher Education, Lifelong Learning, and Competitiveness and Subcommittee on Health, Employment, Labor, and Pensions.

Caucus memberships
Congressional Arts Caucus
Afterschool Caucuses
Blue Collar Caucus
Congressional NextGen 9-1-1 Caucus
Veterinary Medicine Caucus

References

External links

Congressman Joe Courtney official U.S. House website
Joe Courtney for Congress

 

|-

1953 births
21st-century American politicians
Democratic Party members of the United States House of Representatives from Connecticut
Living people
Democratic Party members of the Connecticut House of Representatives
People from Vernon, Connecticut
Politicians from Hartford, Connecticut
Public defenders
Tufts University alumni
University of Connecticut School of Law alumni